The mass-flux fraction (or Hirschfelder-Curtiss variable or Kármán-Penner variable) is the ratio of mass-flux of a particular chemical species to the total mass flux of a gaseous mixture. It includes both the convectional mass flux and the diffusional mass flux. It was introduced by Joseph O. Hirschfelder and Charles F. Curtiss in 1948 and later by Theodore von Kármán and Sol Penner in 1954. The mass-flux fraction of a species i is defined as

where
 is the mass fraction
 is the mass average velocity of the gaseous mixture
 is the average velocity with which the species i diffuse relative to 
 is the density of species i
 is the gas density.

It satisfies the identity

similar to mass fraction, but, the mass-flux fraction can take both positive and negative values. This variable is used in steady, one-dimensional combustion problems in place of mass fraction. For one-dimensional ( direction) steady flows, the conservation equation for the mass-flux fraction reduces to

where  is the mass production rate of species i.

References

Chemical properties
Dimensionless numbers of chemistry
Combustion